The 2015–16 UAB Blazers women's basketball team represents the University of Alabama at Birmingham during the 2015–16 NCAA Division I women's basketball season. The Blazers, led by second year head coach Randy Norton, played their home games at the Bartow Arena and were members of Conference USA. They finished the season 15–16, 7–11 in C-USA play to finish in a 3-way tie for eighth place. They advanced to the quarterfinals of the C-USA women's tournament where they lost to UTEP.

Roster

Schedule

|-
!colspan=9 style="background:#006600; color:#CFB53B;"| Exhibition

|-
!colspan=9 style="background:#006600; color:#CFB53B;"| Non-conference regular season

|-
!colspan=9 style="background:#006600; color:#CFB53B;"| Conference USA regular season

|-
!colspan=9 style="background:#006600; color:#CFB53B;"| Conference USA Women's Tournament

See also
2015–16 UAB Blazers men's basketball team

References

UAB Blazers women's basketball seasons
UAB